Mariia Posa (born 21 February 1988, in Helsinki)  is a Finnish retired ice hockey defenceman. She played for several years as a member of the Finnish national team and also played for the University of Minnesota Duluth.

Playing career

Minnesota Duluth
In her freshman year with the University of Minnesota-Duluth, Posa helped the Bulldogs qualify for the 2010 NCAA National Collegiate Women's Ice Hockey Tournament and win the NCAA championship.

She was named to the 2010–11 All-WCHA Academic Team and 2011–12 All-WCHA Academic Team.

Professional
After graduating, Posa joined the Espoon Blues. She helped lead the Blues to the back-to-back Finnish Ice Hockey Championships in 2013 and 2014.

Finland
Posa appeared for Team Finland in the 2009 Four Nation's Cup and she won a bronze medal at the 2010 Four Nations Cup in St. John's, Newfoundland.

Career statistics

Finland

Minnesota Duluth

Awards and honors
WCHA Rookie of the Week  (Week of November 18, 2009)

References

1988 births
Living people
Finnish women's ice hockey defencemen
Ice hockey players at the 2010 Winter Olympics
Medalists at the 2010 Winter Olympics
Minnesota Duluth Bulldogs women's ice hockey players
Olympic bronze medalists for Finland
Olympic ice hockey players of Finland
Olympic medalists in ice hockey
Ice hockey people from Helsinki